Morning Express (Chinese: 晨光第一线) is a documentary/current affairs programme produced by Mediacorp Channel 8. It is hosted by a team of the three hosts/newscasters consisting of  Soh Bee Lan, Ng Siew Ling, and Yang Zhen Hua. The show covers a daily brand news belt, headlines of different newspapers, financial and economics bulletin, as well as different lifestyle topic every day. The show replaced the weekday broadcast of Good Morning Singapore.

Presenters
Ng Siew Ling (黄秀玲)
Yang Zhen Hua (杨振华)                         
Soh Bee Lan (苏美兰)

Former Presenters
Kristine Lim Zhi Ying (林稚瑛) - Went over to Current Affairs in Apr 2021
Jiang Huan (蒋睆) - Left in Mar 2019

Segments
0900 - 0910: News 
0910 - 0920: Newspaper (纸上风云)
0920 - 0930: Lifestyle topics of the day
Monday: Spotlight (晨光聚焦)
Tuesday: Sincerity (晨心诚意)
Wednesday: Trending (潮流解码)
Thursday: World News (着眼天下)
Friday: Hobby (玩物壮志)

Trivia
Kristine Lim Zhi Ying's first current affairs program and comeback after she left for Beijing to be a correspondent for Channel NewsAsia and is the only one who crosses over between presenters, newscasters and Hello Singapore.
Yang Zhen Hua and Jiang Huan's debut current affairs programme.
The programme was televised at 11:00am on 25 March 2015, during the national mourning period. It was extended to a 1-hour version from 9 to 10 am on 12 September 2016 and aired outdoors for the first time in Bedok Town Centre.

Accolades

See also
Mediacorp Channel 8
Channel 8 News

External links

References

Current affairs shows
Singaporean television news shows
2014 Singaporean television series debuts
Channel 8 (Singapore) original programming